State Route 199 (SR 199) is part of Maine's system of numbered state highways, located in Hancock County. The route is almost completely within the town of Penobscot except for its southernmost  near its terminus at SR 166A (formerly SR 166), which is in Castine.

Junction list

See also

References

External links

Floodgap Roadgap's RoadsAroundME: Maine State Route 199

199
Transportation in Hancock County, Maine